Tottington Railway station served the town of Tottington in Greater Manchester (then Lancashire), England. It opened in 1882 and continued to serve passengers until the line closed to passengers in 1952 and freight in 1963.

History

The station closed when passenger services were withdrawn from the Holcombe Brook line on 5 May 1952; goods trains continued to serve Tottington until 19 August 1963.

References

Lost Railways of Lancashire by Gordon Suggitt

External links
Tottington Station on navigable 1948 O.S. map
Last Freight to Tottington - Youtube

Disused railway stations in the Metropolitan Borough of Bury
Former Lancashire and Yorkshire Railway stations
Railway stations in Great Britain opened in 1882
Railway stations in Great Britain closed in 1952